Tolé   is a corregimiento in Tolé District, Chiriquí Province, Panama. It is the seat of Tolé District. Its population as of 1990 was 5,292; its population as of 2000 was 3,156.

References

Corregimientos of Chiriquí Province